Pylky was a  of the Soviet Navy which later transferred to the Indonesian Navy and renamed RI Diponegoro (306).

Development 

The development of the first post-war destroyer project based on the previous project 30 was entrusted to the TsKB-17 team. The composition of the armament was finally specified on November 28, 1945. The technical design materials and working drawings were developed under the leadership of the chief designer A. L. Fisher (deputies G. D. Agul, K. A. Maslennikov) in the new, recreated, TsKB-53. The technical design was approved by the Decree of the Council of Ministers of the USSR No. 149-95 of January 28, 1947.

The lead ship of this project was accepted into the USSR Navy on December 21, 1949, on the occasion of J.V. Stalin's birthday. Engineer-Lieutenant Colonel A.T.

Construction and career
The ship was built at Zhdanov Shipyard in Leningrad and was launched on 31 July 1952 and commissioned into the Baltic Fleet on 31 July 1952.

She was decommissioned on 9 May 1964 and sold to the Indonesian Navy. She was renamed RI Diponegoro (306). Later in her service she was renamed as Sultan Badarudin.

She was retired from Indonesian Navy in 1973.

References

Ships built in Russia
Skoryy-class destroyers
1952 ships
Ships built at Severnaya Verf
Ships of the Indonesian Navy